Discoverer 29, also known as Corona 9023, was an American optical reconnaissance satellite which was launched in 1961. It was the first KH-3 Corona''' satellite, which was based on an Agena-B rocket.

The launch of Discoverer 29 occurred at 20:00 UTC on 30 August 1961. A Thor DM-21 Agena-B rocket was used, flying from Launch Complex 75-3-4 at the Vandenberg Air Force Base. Upon successfully reaching orbit, it was assigned the Harvard designation 1961 Psi 1.

Images were recorded onto  film, and returned in a Satellite Recovery Vehicle two days after launch, but all of the images returned were found to be out of focus. The Satellite Recovery Vehicle used by Discoverer 29 was SRV-554. Once its images had been returned, Discoverer 29 remained in orbit until it decayed on 9 September 1961.

References

Spacecraft launched in 1961
Spacecraft which reentered in 1961